The Sunset Legion is a lost 1928 American silent Western film directed by Lloyd Ingraham and Alfred L. Werker, written by Garrett Graham and Frances Marion, and starring Fred Thomson, Edna Murphy, William Courtright, and Harry Woods. It was released on April 21, 1928, by Paramount Pictures.

Cast
 Fred Thomson as Masked Rider / Whittling Cowboy
 Edna Murphy as Susan
 William Courtright as Old Bill
 Harry Woods as Honest John 
 Silver King the Horse as Silver
 Slim Whitaker as Bartender (uncredited)

References

External links

 
 

1928 films
1920s English-language films
1928 Western (genre) films
Paramount Pictures films
Films directed by Lloyd Ingraham
Films directed by Alfred L. Werker
American black-and-white films
Lost Western (genre) films
Lost American films
1928 lost films
Silent American Western (genre) films
1920s American films